Three ships of the Royal Navy have been named HMS Lincoln after the city of Lincoln:

  was a 50-gun fourth rate launched in 1695. She foundered in 1703.
She was transferred to the Royal Navy in 1940, lent to the Norwegian Navy in 1941, then the Soviet Navy in 1944 as Ruzni. She served with them until 1952, when she was sold for scrapping.
  was a  launched in 1960 and broken up in 1983.

Royal Navy ship names